Algerians are the citizens and nationals of the People's Democratic Republic of Algeria. The country's population is predominantly composed of Arabs and Berbers (Amazigh). The term also applies more broadly to any people who are of Algerian nationality, sharing a common culture and identity, as well as those who natively speak Algerian Arabic or other languages of Algeria.

In addition to the approximately 44 million residents of Algeria, there is a large Algerian diaspora as part of the wider Arab diaspora. Considerable Algerian populations can be found in France, Spain, Italy, and the United Kingdom; with smaller notable concentrations in other Arab states as well as the United States, and Canada.

Ethnic groups 

Arabs make up 73.6% of the population of Algeria, Berbers make up 23.2%, Arabized Berbers make up 3%, and others make up 0.2%. Phoenicians, Romans, Byzantines, Arabs, Turks as well as other ethnic groups have contributed to the ethnic makeup and genetic structure of the Algerian population. Descendants of Andalusian refugees are also present in the population of Algiers and other cities. Moreover, Spanish was spoken by these Aragonese and Castillian Morisco descendants deep into the 18th century, and even Catalan was spoken at the same time by Catalan Morisco descendants in the small town of Grish El-Oued.

The Arab population of Algeria is a result of the inflow of sedentary and nomadic Arab tribes from Arabia since the Muslim conquest of the Maghreb in the 7th century with a major wave in the 11th century. The majority of Algerians identify with an Arab-based identity due to the 20th century Arab nationalism. The ethnic Berbers are divided into many groups with varying languages. The largest of these are the Kabyles, who live in the Kabylia region east of Algiers, the Chaoui of North-East Algeria, the Tuaregs in the southern desert and the Shenwa people of North Algeria.

During the colonial period, there was a large (15% in 1960) European population who became known as Pied-Noirs. They were primarily of French, Spanish and Italian origin. Almost all of this population left during the war of independence or immediately after its end.

References 

Algerian diaspora
Society of Algeria
Arabs in Algeria
Arabs
North African people
Algeria
Maghreb
North Africa